A wave pool is a swimming pool in which there are artificially generated, large waves, similar to those of the ocean. Wave pools are often a major feature of water parks, both indoors and outdoors, as well as some leisure centres.

Manufacturers
Wave pools are constructed by many different manufacturers, while some are in-house. Here are a few notable manufacturers:
Murphy’s Waves-Manufacturer of Siam Park's Wave Palace using their Point Break Surf Series
Barr and Wray-Manufacturer of Disney's Typhoon Lagoon using their SurfKing model

History

The origins of wave pools go as far back as the 19th century, as famous fantasy castle builder Ludwig II of Bavaria electrified a lake to create breaking waves.

In 1905, the "Undosa" swimming platform was built on Lake Starnberg in Germany, which used large pontoons to force the lake water to make waves. It has since been converted into a restaurant.

In 1912, the "Bilzbad" in Radebeul, Germany was the first public wave pool built on the ground. It used a wave machine, also called "Undosa," first exhibited the previous year at the International Hygiene Exhibition in Dresden. It still operates.

Another early public wave pool was designed and built in 1927 in Budapest, Hungary in the known Gellért Baths, and appeared one of James A. Fitzpatrick's documentary Traveltalks films about the city in 1938, as one of the main tourist attractions. It remains open.

The natatorium at Bayocean, Oregon also had an early wave-generating machine, before it was destroyed by natural ocean waves in 1932.

A 1929 Pathe Pictorial film featured "Indoor Surfers" frolicking in small, artificially-generated waves in a swimming pool in Munich, Germany. The waves were created by agitators which pushed waves through the diving area and into a shallow area - where kids were bodysurfing little waves: "This is the new kind of swimming bath that is becoming the rage of Germany," one of the captions reads. "No more placid waters for bathers - the mechanism behind the netting keeps everything moving."

In 1939, a public swimming pool in Wembley, London, was equipped with machines that created wavelets to approximate the soothing ebb and flowing motion of the ocean. In the 1940s, Palisades Amusement Park, located on the Hudson River Palisades across from New York City, installed a large waterfall at one end of its salt water pool, the largest of such in the world at the time, which generated small waves much like those in Wembley.

In 1966, Akiruno, Japan's "Summerland Wavepool", nicknamed the "Surf-a-Torium", was the first wave pool accessible to surfers (though only for 15 minutes every hour).
 
Several locations claim to have developed the first wave pool in the United States, including Big Surf in Tempe, Arizona and Point Mallard Park in Decatur, Alabama, which both opened in 1969 (Point Mallard Park opened in 1970 so their claim would have to be inaccurate as is the information previous to this about them.) The first indoor wave pool in the United States opened in 1982 at the Bolingbrook Aquatic Center in Bolingbrook, Illinois.
Opened in 1989, Disney's Typhoon Lagoon is one of the world's largest outdoor wave pools and the strength of the waves makes it possible to bodysurf.

In or around 2018 many wave pools opened. The most famous is Kelly Slater's wave pool in California.

Previous claims that Wave pools use fossil fuel and are bad for the environment are not completely accurate. Point Mallard Park Wave pool in Decatur Alabama receives its power from TVA (Tennessee Valley Authority) via Decatur Utilities, which for this location power is generated via Nuclear Reactor at Browns Ferry and Wheeler Dam Hydroelectric plant.

Operation 
Wave pools replicate the movement of the ocean in different ways, depending on the size of the pool and the size of wave desired. The mechanism that creates the waves is usually located at the far end of the pool, usually where it is deepest. With some wave pools, the floor can be deeper in front of the wave machine, before quickly rising up, creating the wave shape, for example World Waterpark's Blue Thunder Wave Pool.

Compressed air. This works by air being blown onto the water in a chamber that has an opening underwater. When the air hits the water, it pushes it down, creating the waves. This can either work by air pumps being programmed to turn on and off to create the waves, or the air pumps constantly blowing with valves that open and close to create the waves.
Paddle/Panel. A paddle or panel pushes the water, creating the waves. Usually behind the panel is a hydraulic or pneumatic piston that pushes the panel back and forth, in turn pushing the water. This can either work by the panel being on a hinge so it rotates back and forth (in this case the piston pushing it would be on a hinge too), or the panel sitting on rails. This method is becoming increasingly rare, due to the high maintenance it requires. A famous example of this mechanism is World Waterpark's Blue Thunder Wave Pool 
Water tank. This is usually the strongest type of wave machine, utilising large water tanks behind the pool that have water pumped into them, before a valve at its base opens. This allows the water to flow through a channel that slightly angles upwards as it enters the back of the pool, creating sometimes huge waves. When this happens, the wave machine can sometimes make a loud roaring sound, as the air fills the emptying chambers, for example on Disney's Typhoon Lagoon. Famous examples include Siam Park's Wave Palace, holding the record for largest man made waves at 3.3 metres, and the previously mentioned Disney's Typhoon Lagoon.
Other techniques utilize an "accordion mechanism" which opens and closes in order to suck water into its belly (opening) and push it out (closing) to cause waves.

Types and locations 

Generally, wave pools are designed to use fresh water at inland locations, but some of the largest ones, near other seashore developments, use salt water. Wave pools are typically larger than other recreational swimming pools and for that reason are often in parks or other large, open areas.

Some wave pools like those made by Wavegarden at Surf Snowdonia and NLand are expressly designed for surfing rather than for swimming, and accordingly, create much larger waves.
Other surfing wave pool projects, some of which can be in lakes, include Surf Ranch from Kelly Slater Wave Company, Surf Lakes, Webber Wave Pools and Okahina Wave. Surfing can also be done on a static surf simulator but is less realistic than surfing wave pools due to the static wave.

Safety 
Wave pools are more difficult to lifeguard than still pools as the moving water (sometimes combined with sun glare) make it difficult to watch all swimmers. Unlike passive pool safety camera systems, computer-automated drowning detection systems do not work in wave pools. There are also safety concerns in regards to water quality, as wave pools are difficult to chlorinate.

The original eight-foot-deep (approx 2.4m) Tidal Wave pool at New Jersey's Action Park cost three lives in the 1980s, and kept the lifeguards busy rescuing patrons who overestimated their swimming ability. On the first day they officially opened their wavepool, it is said up to 100 people had to be rescued.

Record holders 

See also
 Artificial wave
 Wave tank

Further reading 
 Carl Hoffman, "Endless summer", Wired 12.05

References

External links
 "How Wave Pools Work" @ Howstuffworks.com

Swimming pools